Lawrence Woodmere Academy, also known as "LWA", and "Woodmere Academy", is an independent school located in Woodmere, New York, United States.  It is accredited by the New York State Association of Independent Schools and the New York State Board of Regents.

History

The history of the Academy began with the founding of Lawrence Country Day School in 1891 and Woodmere Academy in 1912. The institutions merged in 1990.

The founders of Woodmere Academy adopted a motto of Disce Servire, "Learn to Serve". When Woodmere Academy and Lawrence Country Day School merged, this motto was expanded to Veritas, Integritas, Servitium, "Truth, Integrity, Service".

The students come from all parts of Long Island, Brooklyn, and Queens, as well as countries abroad.

Notable alumni
Roger Berlind (1930–2020; class of 1948) Theatrical producer and long-time board member of Lehman Brothers Holdings, Inc. and Lehman Brothers Inc, a founders of Carter, Berlind, Potoma & Weillin 1960, a company that would later through Sandy Weill become Shearson Loeb Rhoades, which was eventually sold to American Express in 1981 for approximately $930 million in stock.
Steven Ross (Class of 1955), military historian, William V. Pratt Chair in Military History at  the United States Naval War College, awarded the United States Navy Meritorious Civilian Service Award.
Stuart Beck (1946–2016, Class of 1964), Lawyer and diplomat for Palau who helped negotiate the Compact of Free Association, which established Palau as an independent nation in free association with the United States in 1994.
 Matthew Blank, (Class of 1968), CEO of Showtime Networks
 Karen Burstein (Class of 1960), Politician and former judge who was the unsuccessful Democratic nominee for New York State Attorney General in 1994.
 Michael Cohen (Class of 1984), Executive Vice-President, Trump Organization; Special Counsel to Donald Trump.
 Jordan Dingle (born 2000), college basketball player for the Penn Quakers of the Ivy League.
 Andrew Barth Feldman (born 2002), winner of best actor at the 2018 Jimmy Awards and star of Dear Evan Hansen on Broadway 
 Barbara Heldt (born 1940; class of 1958), emerita professor of Russian and Slavic studies.
 David A. Kessler (born 1951; class of 1969), former Food and Drug Administration Commissioner and best-selling author
 Victor LaValle (born 1972; class of 1991), author
 Richard LeFrak (born 1945; class of 1963), real-estate developer 
 Neil David Levin (1954–2001, class of 1972), Executive Director of the Port Authority of New York and New Jersey, killed during the September 11 terrorist attacks on the World Trade Center.
 Tyrone Nash (born 1988, class of 2006). professional basketball player
 Michael Pertschuk (1933–2022; class of 1950), chairman of the Federal Trade Commission from 1977 to 1981
 Tony Petitti (Class of 1979), Chief Operating Officer of Major League Baseball
 Robin Wagner (born 1957, class of 1975), Olympic figure-skating coach. 
 Bob Wolff (1920–2017, class of 1938), sports radio broadcaster.

References

External links
Official website

International schools in New York (state)
Schools in Nassau County, New York
Five Towns
Private elementary schools in New York (state)
Private middle schools in New York (state)
Private high schools in New York (state)
International high schools
Educational institutions established in 1912
1912 establishments in New York (state)
Preparatory schools in New York (state)